Yitzhak() is a male first name, and is Hebrew for Isaac. Yitzhak may refer to:

People
Yitzhak ha-Sangari, rabbi who converted the Khazars to Judaism
Yitzhak Rabin (1922–1995), Israeli politician and Prime Minister
Yitzhak Shamir (1915–2012), Israeli politician and Prime Minister
Yitzhak Aharonovich (born 1950), Israeli politician
Yitzhak Apeloig (born 1944), Israeli computational chemistry professor and President of the Technion
Yitzhak Arad (1926–2021), Israeli historian
Yitzhak Ben-Aharon (1906–2006), Israeli politician
Yitzhak Ben-Zvi (1884–1963), Israeli politician and President
Yitzhak Danziger (1916–1977), Israeli sculptor
Yitzhak Hatuel (born 1962), Israeli Olympic foil fencer
Yitzhak Hofi (1927–2014), Israeli general
Yitzhak Laor (born 1948), Israeli poet
Yitzhak Mastai (born 1966), Israeli professor of chemistry
Yitzhak Y. Melamed, Israeli-American philosophy professor
Yitzhak Molcho (born 1945), Israeli lawyer 
Yitzhak Mordechai (born 1944), Israeli general and politician
Yitzhak Navon (1921–2015), Israel politician and President
Yitzhak "Vicky" Peretz (1953–2021), Israeli Olympic footballer
Yitzhak Sadeh (1890–1952), Israeli general
Yitzhak Schwartz, birth name of Irving Fields (1915–2016), American pianist and composer
Yitzhak Tshuva (born 1948), Israeli businessman
Yitzhak Yosef (born 1952), Israeli chief rabbi

Fiction
 Yitzhak, fictional character in the musical and film Hedwig and the Angry Inch

See also
 Itzhak

Hebrew masculine given names